Canal de Bolama is a strait in the coast of Guinea Bissau on the Atlantic Ocean.

Geography
The Canal de Bolama runs from NW to SE and is located to the east of the Bissagos Islands, separating Galinhas, at the eastern end of the group, from Bolama, the easternmost island close to the mainland.

References

Straits of the Atlantic Ocean
Bodies of water of Guinea-Bissau
Straits of Africa